List of long course swimming pools in Ireland is an annotated list of swimming pools in Ireland that conform to the Olympic standard. Additionally, it lists other long course facilities that do not quite come up to the full standard of 50 × 25 metres, 10 (middle 8 used) lanes.

Olympic standard pools
 Dublin
National Aquatic Centre, Abbotstown, North Dublin
University College Dublin, Belfield, South Dublin (opened 2012)
 Limerick
University of Limerick, Castletroy. The first Olympic standard pool in Ireland.

Other 50m pools

Open
 West Wood Club, Clontarf, Dublin – 50 metres, 6 lanes A private sports club, open to members only.  The first modern indoor 50 metre pool in Ireland.

Closed
 Blackrock Baths, Dublin - 50 metre outdoor pool. Closed in the late 1980s, and partially dismantled.

See also
 List of long course swimming pools in the United Kingdom

References

External links
 About Olympic and 50m swimming pools in the UK and Ireland

Ireland, Republic of
Swimming pools
Swim
Ireland, Republic of